The 1897 Ohio gubernatorial election was held on November 2, 1897. Incumbent Republican Asa S. Bushnell defeated Democratic nominee Horace L. Chapman with 50.28% of the vote.

General election

Candidates
Major party candidates
Asa S. Bushnell, Republican 
Horace L. Chapman, Democratic

Other candidates
John C. Holiday, Prohibition
Jacob S. Coxey Sr., People's
William Watkins, Socialist Labor
John Richardson, Liberty
Julius Dexter, National Democratic
Samuel J. Lewis, Independent

Results

References

1897
Ohio
Gubernatorial